Carlette Denise Guidry-Falkquay (formerly Guidry-White, née Guidry; born September 4, 1968) is an American former sprinter who won gold medals in the 4 x 100 metres relay at the 1992 Barcelona Olympics, the 1996 Atlanta Olympics and the 1995 World Championships in Gothenburg. Her individual results include winning the 100 metres title at the 1990 Goodwill Games and a bronze medal in the 60 metres at the 1995 World Indoor Championships.

Career
Born Carlette D. Guidry in Houston, Texas in 1968, she finished eighth in the 100 metres final at the 1991 World Championships in Tokyo, before going on to win Olympic relay gold at the 1992 Barcelona Olympics, where she also finished fifth in the 200 metres final. She won a bronze medal in the 60 metres event at the 1995 IAAF World Indoor Championships., and also finished fourth in the World Championships 100 metres final that year. At the 1996 Atlanta Olympics, she won a second Olympic relay gold (she ran in the heats but not the final) and finished eighth in the 200 metres final.

At the collegiate level, Guidry competed for the Texas Longhorns of the University of Texas at Austin between 1987 and 1991. She collected a total of twelve NCAA titles, and was named Southwest Conference Athlete of the Decade in indoor track and outdoor track and field for the 1980s. She was also honoured as Indoor Track And Field Most Outstanding Student-Athletes In Honor Of The 25th Anniversary Of NCAA Women's Championships.

While at Texas, she won the Honda-Broderick Award (now the Honda Sports Award) as the nation's best female collegiate track and field competitor in 1991. She was Inducted into the Texas Track and Field Coaches Hall of Fame, Class of 2014.

International competitions

Personal bests
 100 metres – 10.94 (1991)
 200 metres – 22.14 (1996)
 400 metres – 51.53 (1994)

References

External
 

1968 births
Living people
Track and field athletes from Houston
American female sprinters
African-American female track and field athletes
Olympic gold medalists for the United States in track and field
Athletes (track and field) at the 1992 Summer Olympics
Athletes (track and field) at the 1996 Summer Olympics
World Athletics Championships athletes for the United States
World Athletics Championships medalists
World Athletics Indoor Championships medalists
Medalists at the 1996 Summer Olympics
Medalists at the 1992 Summer Olympics
Goodwill Games medalists in athletics
USA Outdoor Track and Field Championships winners
USA Indoor Track and Field Championships winners
World Athletics Championships winners
Competitors at the 1990 Goodwill Games
Competitors at the 1994 Goodwill Games
World Athletics U20 Championships winners
21st-century African-American people
21st-century African-American women
20th-century African-American sportspeople
20th-century African-American women